Margarya oxytropoides is a species of large operculate freshwater snail, an aquatic gastropod mollusk in the family Viviparidae, the river snails.

Distribution 
The distribution of Margarya francheti includes Dian Lake, Lugu Lake, and small lakes around Zhaotong in Yunnan Province, China.

Description 
Zhang et al. (2015) provided details about the shell and about the radula.

References

Viviparidae